Sofia is a region in northern Madagascar. It is named for the Sofia River. The region covers 50,100 km² and had a population of 1,500,227 in 2018. The administrative capital is Antsohihy.

Administrative divisions
Sofia Region is divided into seven districts, which are sub-divided into 108 communes.

 Analalava District - 11 communes
 Antsohihy District - 12 communes
 Bealanana District - 13 communes
 Befandriana-Nord District - 12 communes
 Boriziny-Vaovao District - 15 communes
 Mampikony District - 6 communes
 Mandritsara District - 22 communes

Transport

Airports
Analalava Airport
Antsohihy Airport
Bealanana Airport
Befandriana-Avaratra Airport
Mampikony Airport
Mandritsara Airport
Boriziny Vaovao Airport

Roads
Sofia is crossed by the National Road 4 (Antananarivo-Mahajanga), National Road 6  (Antsohihy-Diego Suarez), the National road 31 (Antsohihy to Mandritsara) and National road 32 (Antsohihy to Bealanana).

Protected Areas
Bongolava forest corridor
 Marotandrano Reserve
 Bora Reserve
 Tampoketsa Analamaitso Reserve
Radama Islands/Sahamalaza National Park
Bemanevika New Protected Area
Mahimborondro New Protected Area
Part of Makira Natural Park
Anjajavy Forest New Protected Area

External links
  Official Website

References

 
Regions of Madagascar